The 1976 World Junior Figure Skating Championships were on March 10–13, 1976 in Megève, France. Sanctioned by the International Skating Union in which younger figure skaters compete for the title of World Junior Champion. It was the first World Junior Figure Skating Championships to be held.

Results

Men

Ladies

Pairs

Ice dance

References

World Junior Figure Skating Championships
World Junior
F
International figure skating competitions hosted by France